The 1989 Asia Golf Circuit was the 28th season of golf tournaments that comprised the Asia Golf Circuit.

American Brian Claar claimed the overall circuit championship.

Tournament schedule
The table below shows the 1989 Asia Golf Circuit schedule. For the first time, the circuit had eleven tournaments with the addition of the Pakistan Open.

Final standings
The Asia Golf Circuit operated a points based system to determine the overall circuit champion, with points being awarded in each tournament to the leading players. At the end of the season, the player with the most points was declared the circuit champion, and there was a prize pool to be shared between the top players in the points table.

References

Asia Golf Circuit
Asia Golf Circuit